Romania competed at the 1992 Summer Olympics in Barcelona, Spain. It was the first Summer Games for the nation after the fall of Communism in 1989. 172 competitors, 104 men and 68 women, took part in 128 events in 18 sports.

Medalists
Romania finished in 14th position in the final medal rankings, with four gold medals and 18 medals overall.

|  style="text-align:left; width:72%; vertical-align:top;"|

| style="text-align:left; width:23%; vertical-align:top;"|

Competitors
The following is the list of number of competitors in the Games.

Athletics

Men's 110m Hurdles
 Mircea Oaida 
 Heats — 14.04 (→ did not advance)

Men's Long Jump
Bogdan Tudor
 Qualification — 8.07 m
 Final — 7.61 m (→ 12th place)

Men's Discus Throw
Costel Grasu 
 Qualification — 63.06 m
 Final — 62.86 m (→ 4th place)

Men's Shot Put
Gheorghe Gușet 
 Qualification — 18.96 m (→ did not advance)

Women's 800 metres
Ella Kovacs
 Heat — 1:59.88
 Semifinal — 2:00.89
 Final — 1:57.95 (→ 6th place)

Leontina Salagean
 Heat — 2:01.44 (→ did not advance)

Women's 400m Hurdles
Nicoleta Carutasu
 Heat — 57.18 (→ did not advance)

Women's Marathon
 Elena Murgoci — 3:01.46 (→ 32nd place)

Women's High Jump
 Galina Astafei 
 Qualification — 1.92 m
 Final — 2.00 m (→  Silver Medal)

 Oana Musunoi 
 Qualification — 1.86 m (→ did not advance)

Women's Long Jump
 Mirela Dulgheru 
 Heat — 6.83 m
 Final — 6.71 m (→ 4th place)

 Marieta Ilcu 
 Heat — 6.46 m (→ did not advance)

Women's Discus Throw
 Nicoleta Grasu 
 Heat — 60.62m (→ did not advance)

 Manuela Tirneci 
 Heat — 59.44m (→ did not advance)

 Cristina Boit 
 Heat — 56.68m (→ did not advance)

Women's Heptathlon
 Petra Vaideanu 
 Final result — 6152 points (→ 13th place)

Badminton

Boxing

Men's Light Flyweight (– 48 kg)
 Valentin Barbu
 First Round – Defeated Mohammed Haioun (ALG), 11:2 
 Second Round – Defeated Tadahiro Sasaki (JPN), 10:7 
 Quarterfinals – Lost to Jan Quast (GER), 7:15

Canoeing

Diving

Men

Women

Fencing

15 fencers, 10 men and 5 women represented Romania in 1992.

Men's épée
 Adrian Pop
 Gabriel Pantelimon
 Cornel Milan

Men's team épée
 Adrian Pop, Gabriel Pantelimon, Cornel Milan, Gheorghe Epurescu, Nicolae Mihăilescu

Men's sabre
 Daniel Grigore
 Vilmoș Szabo
 Alexandru Chiculiță

Men's team sabre
 Alexandru Chiculiță, Victor Găureanu, Daniel Grigore, Florin Lupeică, Vilmoș Szabo

Women's foil
 Reka Zsofia Lazăr-Szabo
 Claudia Grigorescu
 Elisabeta Guzganu-Tufan

Women's team foil
 Reka Zsofia Lazăr-Szabo, Claudia Grigorescu, Elisabeta Guzganu-Tufan, Laura Cârlescu-Badea, Roxana Dumitrescu

Gymnastics

Handball

Preliminary round

Group B

7th/8th classification 

Team roster
Daniel Apostu
Dumitru Berbece
Mitica Bontas
Alexandru Buligan
Alexandru Dedu
Marian Dumitru
Robert Ioan Licu
Ion Mocanu
Costica Neagu
Adi Daniel Popovici
Ioan Rudi Prisacaru
Ionel Radu
Gheorghe-Titel Raduta
Gabriel Sorin Toacsen
Maricel Voinea
Valentin Cristian Zaharia
Head coach: Cezar Paul Nica

Judo

Sorin Zaharuk

Modern pentathlon

One male pentathlete represented Romania in 1992.

Individual
 Marian Gheorghe

Rhythmic gymnastics

Rowing

Men's Coxless Pairs
Vasile Tomoiagă and Dragoș Neagu

Men's Coxed Pairs
Dimitrie Popescu, Nicolae Țaga and Dumitru Răducanu

Men's Coxless Fours
Vasile Hanuseac, Nicolae Spîrcu, Florin Ene, and Ioan Snep

Men's Coxed Fours
Viorel Talapan, Iulică Ruican, Dimitrie Popescu, Nicolae Țaga, and Dumitru Răducanu

Men's coxed eight
Ioan Vizitiu, Dănuț Dobre, Gabriel Marin, Iulică Ruican, Viorel Talapan, Vasile Năstase, Valentin Robu, Vasile Măstăcan, and Marin Gheorghe

Women's Single Sculls
Elisabeta Oleniuc-Lipă

Women's Double Sculls
Elisabeta Oleniuc-Lipă and Veronica Cogeanu-Cochela

Women's Coxless Pairs
Doina Șnep-Bălan and Doina Robu

Women's Quadruple Sculls
 Constanța Burcică-Pipota, Vera Cochela, Anișoara Dobre-Bălan, and Doina Ignat — Rowing, Women's Quadruple Sculls

Women's Coxless Fours
Victoria Lepădatu, Iulia Bobeică, Adriana Chelariu-Bazon, and Maria Pădurariu

Women's coxed eight
 Adriana Bazon-Chelariu, Iulia Bobeica, Elena Georgescu, Victoria Lepădatu, Viorica Neculai, Ioana Olteanu, Maria Păduraru, and Doina Robu — Rowing, Women's Eights

Shooting

Swimming

Men's 200m Freestyle
Robert Pinter
 Heat – 1:52.24 (→ did not advance, 25th place)

Men's 200m Butterfly
Robert Pinter
 Heat – 1:59.59
 Final – 1:59.34 (→ 7th place)

Men's 200m Individual Medley
Marian Satnoianu
 Heat – 2:06.45 (→ did not advance, 25th place)

Men's 400m Individual Medley
Marian Satnoianu
 Heat – 4:26.33 (→ did not advance, 17th place)

Women's 50 m Freestyle
Liliana Dobrescu
 Heat – 26.76 (→ did not advance, 21st place)

Diana Ureche
 Heat – 26.96 (→ did not advance, 30th place)

Women's 100 m Freestyle
Liliana Dobrescu
 Heat – 56.45
 B-Final – 56.17 (→ 10th place)

Diana Ureche
 Heat – 58.83 (→ did not advance, 31st place)

Women's 200 m Freestyle
Liliana Dobrescu
 Heat – 2:00.51
 Final – 2:00.48 (→ 5th place)

Carla Negrea
 Heat – 2:03.16
 B-Final – 2:02.96 (→ 15th place)

Women's 400 m Freestyle
Beatrice Coada
 Heat – 4:16.23
 B-Final – 4:14.90 (→ 12th place)

Carla Negrea
 Heat – 4:17.00 
 B-Final – 4:14.92 (→ 13th place)

Women's 800 m Freestyle
Beatrice Coada
 Heat – 8:44.17 (→ did not advance, 10th place)

Carla Negrea
 Heat – 8:48.36 (→ did not advance, 11th place)

Women's 100 m Backstroke
Claudia Stanescu
 Heat – 1:04.44 (→ did not advance, 20th place)

Women's 200 m Backstroke
Claudia Stanescu
 Heat – 2:18.39 (→ did not advance, 29th place)

Women's 200 m Breaststroke
Beatrice Coada
 Heat – 2:34.97 (→ did not advance, 20th place)

Women's 100 m Butterfly
Diana Ureche
 Heat – 1:02.72 (→ did not advance, 23rd place)

Iuliana Pantilimon
 Heat – 1:04.07 (→ did not advance, 33rd place)

Women's 200 m Butterfly
Iuliana Pantilimon
 Heat – 2:15.44
 B-Final – 2:14.95 (→ 14th place)

Corina Dumitru
 Heat – 2:16.86 (→ did not advance, 21st place)

Women's 200 m Individual Medley
Noemi Lung
 Heat – 2:18.12 
 B-Final – 2:18.97 (→ 13th place)

Women's 400 m Individual Medley
Beatrice Coada
 Heat – 4:48.12
 B-Final – 4:50.60 (→ 15th place)

Noemi Lung
 Heat – 4:53.91 (→ did not advance, 18th place)

Women's 4 × 100 m Freestyle Relay
Diana Ureche, Carla Negrea, Beatrice Coada, and Liliana Dobrescu 
 Heat – 3:55.52 (→ did not advance, 12th place)

Women's 4 × 100 m Medley Relay
Claudia Stanescu, Beatrice Coada, Diana Ureche, and Liliana Dobrescu 
 Heat – 4:17.91 (→ did not advance, 12th place)

Table tennis

Tennis

Men's Singles Competition
 Andrei Pavel 
 First round — Lost to Carl-Uwe Steeb (Germany) 5-7, 2-6, 2-6

Men's Doubles Competition
 George Cosac and Dinu Pescariu 
 First round — Defeated László Markovits and Sándor Noszály (Hungary) retired
 Second round — Defeated Omar Camporese and Diego Nargiso (Italy) 6-1, 4-6, 4-6, 6-4, 6-2
 Quarterfinals — Lost to Wayne Ferreira and Piet Norval (South Africa) 0-6, 3-6, 2-6

Women's Singles Competition
 Irina Spîrlea
 First Round – Lost to Arantxa Sánchez Vicario (Spain) 1-6, 3-6

Weightlifting

Wrestling

References

Nations at the 1992 Summer Olympics
1992
O